Dimitrios Bakochristos (born 16 April 1983) is a Greek Paralympic powerlifter of short stature. He is a two-time bronze medalist at the Summer Paralympics and a two-time bronze medalist at the World Para Powerlifting Championships.

Career 

He represented Greece at the 2016 Summer Paralympics held in Rio de Janeiro, Brazil and he won the bronze medal in the men's 54 kg event. Bakochristos lifted 162 kg which was sufficient for the bronze medal; although Bruno Carra (representing Brazil) lifted the same amount as Bakochristos, he did not win the medal as his body weight was higher. He also won the bronze medal in the men's 54 kg event at the 2020 Summer Paralympics held in Tokyo, Japan.

At the 2019 World Para Powerlifting Championships held in Nur-Sultan, Kazakhstan, he won the bronze medal in the men's 54 kg event. He also won the bronze medal in this event at the 2017 World Para Powerlifting Championships held in Mexico City, Mexico.

Results

References

External links 
 

Living people
1983 births
Place of birth missing (living people)
Greek male weightlifters
Paralympic powerlifters of Greece
Powerlifters at the 2016 Summer Paralympics
Powerlifters at the 2020 Summer Paralympics
Medalists at the 2016 Summer Paralympics
Medalists at the 2020 Summer Paralympics
Paralympic medalists in powerlifting
Paralympic bronze medalists for Greece
Sportspeople with dwarfism
21st-century Greek people